The Yazoo River is a river in the U.S. states of Louisiana and Mississippi. It is considered by some to mark the southern boundary of what is called the Mississippi Delta, a broad floodplain that was cultivated for cotton plantations before the American Civil War. It has continued to be devoted to large-scale agriculture.

History
The Yazoo River was named by French explorer La Salle in 1682 as "Rivière des Yazous" in reference to the Yazoo tribe living near the river's mouth at its confluence with the Mississippi. The exact meaning of the term is unclear. One long held belief is that it means "river of death".

The river is 188 miles (303 km) long and is formed by the confluence of the Tallahatchie and the Yalobusha rivers, where present-day Greenwood developed. The river parallels the Mississippi River in the latter's floodplain for some distance before joining it north of Vicksburg, Mississippi.  Natural levees which flank the Mississippi prevent the Yazoo from joining it before Vicksburg.  A "yazoo stream" is a hydrologic term that was coined to describe any river or major stream with similar characteristics. Potamologists believe the Yazoo River had its origins as the lower Ohio River.

The French (and later European Americans) historically called the surrounding area of Mississippi and Alabama  the Yazoo lands, after the river.  This became the basis for naming the Yazoo Land Scandal of the late 18th and early 19th century.

The river was of major importance during the American Civil War.  The Confederates used the first electrically detonated underwater mine in the river in 1862 near Vicksburg to sink the Union ironclad USS Cairo.  The last section of the Cairo was raised on December 12, 1964. It has been restored and is now on permanent display to the public at the Vicksburg National Military Park.  There are 29 sunken ships from the Civil War beneath the waters of the river. The steamer Dew Drop was reportedly sunk near Roebuck Lake as an obstruction to the United States Navy, but Union sources claim the vessel was captured and burned.

Variant names of the Yazoo River include Zasu River, Yazous River, Yahshoo River, Rivière des Yasoux, and Fiume del Yasous.

In 1876, the Mississippi River changed its course, shifting west several miles and leaving Vicksburg without a river front. In 1902, the U.S. Army Corps of Engineers diverted the Yazoo River into the old river bed, forming the Yazoo Diversion Canal. The modern-day port of Vicksburg is still located on this canal. Commercial navigation of the Yazoo River has declined considerably since the 1990s and is mainly concentrated on the section from Vicksburg to Yazoo City.

At Long Lake, MS, the river measures 18,486 cubic feet per second.

Gallery

See also
List of rivers of Mississippi
Mississippi Delta
Flood Control Act of 1937
Yazoo stream

Yazoo land scandal

References

External links
Geology
Yazoo Basin - Engineering Geology Mapping Program PDF files of publications about and maps of the geology of the Yazoo River region.
Ecoregions
Ecoregions of the Mississippi Alluvial Plain 
Ecoregions of Mississippi

Rivers of Mississippi
Tributaries of the Mississippi River
Bodies of water of Humphreys County, Mississippi
Bodies of water of Yazoo County, Mississippi
Bodies of water of Leflore County, Mississippi
Bodies of water of Warren County, Mississippi
Mississippi Valley Division
Mississippi placenames of Native American origin